West Burlington may refer to:

 West Burlington, Iowa, United States
 West Burlington, New York, United States

See also

 Burlington (disambiguation)
 South Burlington
 West Burlington Township